Darbyville may refer to:
Darbyville, Iowa, an unincorporated community in Appanoose County
Darbyville, Ohio, a village in Pickway County
Darbyville, Virginia, a community in Lee County